The Twenty-second Amendment of the Constitution of Pakistan, officially known as the Constitution (Twenty-second Amendment) Act, 2016, sets to amend the procedure for the appointment, qualifications and other prerequisites for the chief election commissioner (CEC) and four members of the Election Commission of Pakistan (ECP).

Proposal and enactment
The Constitution (Twenty-second Amendment) Bill, 2016 was introduced in the National Assembly of Pakistan by Zahid Hamid, then Minister for Law and Justice. The full text of the Statement of Objects and Reasons appended to the bill is given below:

The Bill was considered and passed unanimously by the National Assembly of Pakistan on 19 May 2016, and the Senate of Pakistan on 2 June 2016. The bill received assent from the then President Mamnoon Hussain on 8 June 2016, and came into force on the same day. It was notified in The Gazette of Pakistan on 10 June 2016.

References

2016 in law
2016 in Pakistan
Amendments to the Constitution of Pakistan
2016 in Pakistani politics